Tetraneuris argentea, the perkysue, is a North American species of plants in the sunflower family. It grows in the southwestern United States, primarily in Arizona and New Mexico with additional populations in Utah, Colorado, and the Texas Panhandle.

It forms a branching underground caudex sometimes producing as many as 12 above-ground stems. One plant can produce as many as 30 flower heads. Each head has 8–14 yellow ray flowers surrounding 25-100 yellow disc flowers.

References

External links
photo of herbarium specimen at Missouri Botanical Garden, collected in New Mexico in 1847

argentea
Flora of the Southwestern United States
Plants described in 1849